This is a list of current University of Oxford dining clubs. All are social in nature, and recruit members by private invitation, for a programme of drinking and dining. Members are drawn exclusively from the student body of the University of Oxford. Most have individual costumes and traditions, and maintain a high degree of secrecy concerning their membership and activities.

University wide
The Assassins (male society)
The Bullingdon Club (founded 1780; dress in navy blue tailcoats, with navy velvet collar, ivory silk lapels, brass buttons, mustard waistcoat, and a sky blue bow tie; club tie is sky blue striped with ivory; sometimes called The Buller; male society)
The Delilahs (female society)
The Gridiron Club (founded 1884; commonly called The Grid; club tie is dark blue with white gridirons; mixed gender society)
The Piers Gaveston Society (founded 1977; limited to 12 members; mixed gender society)
The Stoics (dress in black tailcoats, with bi-coloured socks, braces, and bow ties of pale blue and yellow; male society)
The Viceroys  (dress in black tailcoats, with bow ties of purple with yellow and blue stripes; male society)

College based
The Abbotts, Corpus Christi (defunct, male society)
The Alices, Christ Church (female society)
L’Ancien Régime, Merton (mixed gender society)
The Black Cygnets, St Hugh's (male society)
Bugger Ruggers, St Edmund Hall (female society)
The Cardinals, Christ Church (male society)
The Claret Club, Trinity (male society)
The Dolphins, Jesus (female society)
The Eaglets, The Queen's (male society)
The Elizabethan Society, Jesus (male society)
The Faeries, Lincoln (female society)
Flowers and Fairies, Christ Church (male society)
The George
The Goblin Club, Lincoln (founded 1902; limited to between 12 and 15 members; extensive silverware collection; club tie in colours of port, champagne, and claret; male society)
The Halcyon Club, The Queen's (male society)
The King Charles Club, St John's (claims to be the oldest University dining club; club tie is black, with stripes of pacific blue edged with gold; male society)
The Loder, Christ Church (members drink only from 18th-century silver goblets; male society)
The Missionaries, Magdalen (male society)
The Mantis, Magdalen (female society)
The Mercurials, Christ Church (male society)
The Millers, Oriel (male and female society)
The Myrmidon Club, Merton (founded 1865; mixed gender society)
The Myrmaids, Merton (female society)
The Musketeers, Oriel (male society)
The Nondescripts Club, Christ Church (male society)
The Penguin Club, Hertford (possibly defunct; male society)
The Phoenix Club, Brasenose (claims to be the oldest University dining club; dress in brown tailcoats, and dine with a silver phoenix at the table; limited to 12 members; male society)
The Pythic Club, Christ Church (founded by 1845)
The Regent's Rabbits, Regent's Park College (female society)
The Reginae Club, The Queen's
The Sir Henry Pelham Gentleman's Sporting Society, Hertford (commonly known as Pelhams; male society)
Somerville Ladies Ultimate Tequila Society, Somerville (female society)
The Steamers, Keble (male society)
The Syndicate, St Edmund Hall, Oxford (male society)

References

Clubs and societies of the University of Oxford
Dining clubs
University of Oxford-related lists